Friedrich Carl Knauer (31 March 1850, Graz – 31 July 1926, Vienna) was an Austrian zoologist.

Friedrich Knauer studied physics, chemistry and zoology at the University of Vienna from 1868 to 1872. In 1887, he became a director Vivarium in Vienna Prater. In 1893, he became the director of Vienna Zoo. 

Knauer wrote zoological books for schools and instruction in science as well as popular scientific works. After his death, Knauer's ashes were buried at Feuerhalle Simmering. In 1930, a street in Favoriten was named Friedrich Knauer Gasse.

Works 
 Die bauende Thierwelt. Beschreibung der wichtigeren Thierbaue nach fremden und eigenen Beobachtungen. Pichler, Wien o.J.
 Die fremdländischen Amphibien und Reptilien. Frankreich, Spanien, Italien, Griechenland, Rußland, Afrika. Für den Naturfreund beschrieben. Wien o.J.
 Die Reptilien und Amphibien Nieder-Oesterreichs. Eine faunistische Skizze. Wien 1875
 Amphibien- und Reptilienzucht. Köhler, Wien 1875
 Beobachtungen an Reptilien und Amphibien in der Gefangenschaft. Hölder, Wien 1875
 Fang der Amphibien und Reptilien und deren Conservierung für Schulzwecke. Hölder, Wien 1875
 Unsere Kenntnisse von der Entstehung und dem Baue des Chlorophyll`s und dessen Rolle im Pflanzenleben. Hölder, Wien 1875
 Die alte Grenzscheide zwischen Thier- und Pflanzenwelt und deren Umsturz durch die moderne Naturwissenschaft. Hölder, Wien 1876
 Deutschlands und Österreichs Reptilien. Pichler, Wien 1877
 Europas Kriechtiere und Lurche. Pichler, Wien 1877
 Naturgeschichte der Lurche (Amphibiologie). Pichler, Wien 1878
 Naturgeschichte des Thierreiches. Lehr- und Lesebuch für die unteren Klassen der Gymnasien. Pichler, Wien 1878
 Ein Ausflug nach Schönbrunn. Selbstverlag, Wien 1879
 Deutschlands und Österreichs Amphibien. Für den Naturfreund beschrieben und nach ihrem Leben beschrieben. Pichler, Wien 1881
 Handwörterbuch der Zoologie. Enke, Stuttgart 1887
 Zur Gründung eines großen zoologischen Gartens in Wien. 1. Wiener Vereinsbuchdruckerei, Wien 1891
 Schönbrunn. Belehrender Führer. Lechner, Wien 1898
 Zwiegestalt der Geschlechter in der Thierwelt (Dimorphismus). Teubner, Leipzig 1907
 Vogelschutz und Federnindustrie. Eine Streitfrage. Braumüller, Wien 1914
 Menschenaffen. Ihr Frei- und Gefangenleben. Thomas, Leipzig, um 1915
 Naturschutztage. Anregungen zur Erziehung unserer Jugend zum Naturschutz für Eltern und Lehrer. Thomas, Leipzig 1916
 Waldgänge. Unseren Jungwanderern zur Anregung und Belehrung. Jugendverlag Eckarthaus, Wien 1924

References 
 Felix Czeike: Historisches Lexikon Wien Bd. 3. Kremayr & Scheriau, Wien 1994
 Andreas Daum, Wissenschaftspopularisierung im 19. Jahrhundert: Bürgerliche Kultur, naturwissenschaftliche Bildung und die deutsche Öffentlichkeit, 1848–1914. Munich: Oldenbourg, 1998, pp. 194, 235, 365, 385–91, 412, 496–7.

External links
 

19th-century Austrian zoologists
Austrian taxonomists
1850 births
1926 deaths
Scientists from Vienna
Scientists from Graz
20th-century Austrian zoologists
Burials at Feuerhalle Simmering
University of Vienna alumni